Giovanni Battista Recchi was an Italian painter  of the 17th century, a pupil of Pier Francesco Mazzucchelli, and brother of Giovanni Paolo Recchi. Ho became well known at Turin, where he was working about 1660. He painted historical subjects, and was assisted in his studio by his nephew Giovanni Antonio Recchi.

References

Italian Baroque painters
Painters from Turin
Year of death unknown
Year of birth unknown
17th-century Italian painters
Italian male painters